Subhra Sourav Das is an Indian television and films actor based in Kolkata. He also worked at Kaushik Sen's theatre group Swapnasandhani.

Early life and career
Das wanted to be a professional footballer, but an accident took his dream off. He has gone through instruction to bed rest and never go back to field again to play football. During that period he watched many films and read several books. He became interested to acting. Later, he met with Kaushik Sen and became a part of Swapnasandhani theater group. That is the start of his acting career. After that, he also acted in several movies. He frequently collaborated with director Anjan Dutt in his films like, Ganesh Talkies (his film debut), Byomkesh Phire Elo, Hemanta, Byomkesh o Chiriyakhana, The Bongs Again. Apart from that he acted in Srijit Mukherjee's Zulfiqar. He also acted in several T.V. series.

Filmography

Films

Television

Theatre

Macbeth as Malcolm
Antigone as Haemon

References

External links
 

Bengali male actors
Male actors in Bengali cinema
Living people
Vidyasagar College alumni
1988 births
Bengali male television actors
Male actors from Kolkata